James Ellison (17 March 1901 – 5 January 1958) was an English professional footballer who played as a full-back for various clubs, including Southampton and Rochdale, in the 1920s.

Football career
Ellison was born in St Helens, Lancashire and played his early football as an amateur with  St Helens YMCA, Tranmere Rovers, Rotherham County and Rhyl United before he moved to the south coast to join Southampton in May 1927.

After a satisfactory trial period, Ellison signed a professional contract in October 1927. He spent most of his time with the Saints in the reserves, making 59 appearances in his year at The Dell. His only first-team appearance came on 10 March 1928, when he took the place of Arthur Bradford at right-back for the game against Port Vale; the match was lost 2–1.

In the summer of 1928, Ellison returned to Lancashire to join Rochdale for whom he made 16 appearances in the Football League Third Division North, before winding up his career back in Wales with Connah's Quay.

Later career
After retiring from football, he returned to St Helens, where he worked for Forster's Glass Company, playing occasionally for the works team.

References

External links
Career details on www.11v11.com

1901 births
1958 deaths
Association football defenders
Connah's Quay & Shotton F.C. players
English Football League players
English footballers
Footballers from St Helens, Merseyside
Rhyl F.C. players
Rochdale A.F.C. players
Rotherham County F.C. players
Southampton F.C. players
St Helens Town A.F.C. players
Tranmere Rovers F.C. players